Meyer Howard Abrams (July 23, 1912 – April 21, 2015), usually cited as M. H. Abrams, was an American literary critic, known for works on romanticism, in particular his book The Mirror and the Lamp. Under Abrams's editorship, The Norton Anthology of English Literature became the standard text for undergraduate survey courses across the U.S. and a major trendsetter in literary canon formation.

Early life 
Born in Long Branch, New Jersey, Abrams was the son of Eastern European Jewish immigrants. The son of a house painter and the first in his family to go to college, he entered Harvard University as an undergraduate in 1930. He went into English because, he says, "there weren't jobs in any other profession..., so I thought I might as well enjoy starving, instead of starving while doing something I didn't enjoy."  After earning his bachelor's degree in 1934, Abrams won a Henry Fellowship to Magdalene College, Cambridge, where his tutor was I. A. Richards.  He returned to Harvard for graduate school in 1935 and received a master's degree in 1937 and a Ph.D. in 1940.

Career 
During World War II, he served at the Psycho-Acoustics Laboratory at Harvard. He describes his work as solving the problem of voice communications in a noisy military environment by establishing military codes that are highly audible and inventing selection tests for personnel who had a superior ability to recognize sound in a noisy background.

In 1945, Abrams became a professor at Cornell University. The literary critics Harold Bloom, Gayatri Spivak and E. D. Hirsch, and the novelists William H. Gass and Thomas Pynchon were among his students. He was elected a Fellow of the American Academy of Arts and Sciences in 1963 and a member of the American Philosophical Society in 1973. As of March 4, 2008, he was Class of 1916 Professor of English Emeritus there.

Personal life 
His wife of 71 years, Ruth, predeceased him in 2008. He turned 100 in July 2012. Abrams died on April 21, 2015, in Ithaca, New York, at the age of 102.

The Mirror and the Lamp 
Abrams offers evidence that until the Romantics, literature was typically understood as a mirror reflecting the real world in some kind of mimesis; whereas for the Romantics, writing was more like a lamp: the light of the writer's inner soul spilled out to illuminate the world. In 1998, Modern Library ranked The Mirror and the Lamp one of the 100 greatest English-language nonfiction books of the 20th century.

The Norton Anthology of English Literature 
Abrams was the general editor of The Norton Anthology, and the editor of The Romantic Period (1798–1832) in that anthology, and he evaluated writers and their reputations. In his introduction to Lord Byron, he emphasized how Byronism relates to Nietzsche's idea of the superman. In the introduction to Percy Bysshe Shelley, Abrams said, "The tragedy of Shelley's short life was that intending always the best, he brought disaster and suffering upon himself and those he loved."

Classification of literary theories 

Literary theories, Abrams argues, can be divided into four main groups:

 Mimetic Theories (interested in the relationship between the Work and the Universe)
 Pragmatic Theories (interested in the relationship between the Work and the Audience)
 Expressive Theories (interested in the relationship between the Work and the Artist)
 Objective Theories (interested in close reading of the Work)

Works 
 The Mirror and the Lamp: Romantic Theory and the Critical Tradition (1953) 
 The Poetry of Pope: a selection (1954) 
 Literature and Belief: English Institute essays, 1957. (1957) editor 
 A Glossary of Literary Terms (Geoffrey Harpham, 1957; 9th ed. 2009) 
 English Romantic Poets: modern essays in criticism (1960) 
 The Norton Anthology of English Literature (1962) founding editor, many later editions
 The Milk of Paradise: the effect of opium visions on the works of DeQuincey, Crabbe, Francis Thompson, and Coleridge (1970) 
 Natural Supernaturalism: Tradition and Revolution in Romantic Literature (1971) 
 The Correspondent Breeze: essays on English Romanticism (1984) 
 Doing Things with Texts: essays in criticism and critical theory (1989) 
 The Fourth Dimension of a Poem and Other Essays (2012)

References

Bibliography 
 Lawrence Lipking, editor (1981) High Romantic Argument: Essays For M.H. Abrams

External links 

 "The Johns Hopkins Guide to Literary Theory & Criticism" entry Short informative text on him.
 M.H. Abrams reads poetry aloud at the National Humanities Center

1912 births
2015 deaths
20th-century American male writers
20th-century American non-fiction writers
21st-century American non-fiction writers
American academics of English literature
American literary critics
American literary theorists
American male non-fiction writers
American centenarians
Cornell University faculty
Literary critics of English
Members of the American Academy of Arts and Letters
Jewish American academics
People from Long Branch, New Jersey
Harvard College alumni
Alumni of Magdalene College, Cambridge
Fellows of the American Academy of Arts and Sciences
National Humanities Medal recipients
Men centenarians
21st-century American male writers
Corresponding Fellows of the British Academy
21st-century American Jews
Members of the American Philosophical Society